Thereva inornata  is a Palearctic species of stiletto fly in the family Therevidae.

References

Therevidae
Insects described in 1909